Gunaveera Cinkaiariyan was an Aryacakravarti king of the Jaffna Kingdom. Local sources say that he ruled Jaffna from 1414 or 1417. After his reign, his son Kanakasooriya Cinkaiariyan ruled the Jaffna kingdom

Notes

References
 Yalpana Vaipava Malai

Kings of Jaffna
Sri Lankan Tamil royalty